Note — many sporting events did not take place because of World War II

1941 in sports describes the year's events in world sport.

American football
 NFL Championship: the Chicago Bears won 37–9 over the New York Giants at Wrigley Field
 Minnesota Golden Gophers – college football national champions.
 Chicago Bears win only meeting vs. Green Bay Packers in the playoffs. On January 23, 2011, they will meet again in the playoffs. 
 At a college game in Youngstown, Ohio, game officials use a penalty flag for the first time.

Association football
 La Liga won by Atlético Aviación
 German football championship won by SK Rapid Wien
 Serie A won by Bologna
 Primeira Liga won by Sporting CP
There is no major football competition in England, Scotland or France due to World War II. In England, several regional leagues are played but statistics from these are not counted in players’ figures.

Australian rules football
 Victorian Football League
 Melbourne wins the 45th VFL Premiership, beating Essendon 19.13 (127) to 13.20 (98) in the 1941 VFL Grand Final
 Brownlow Medal awarded to Norman Ware (Footscray)
 South Australian National Football League:
 4 October: Norwood 14.16 (100) beats Sturt 10.11 (71) for their nineteenth premiership but first since 1929.
 Western Australian National Football League:
 11 October: West Perth 14.14 (98) beat East Fremantle 10.17 (77) to win their eighth WANFL premiership.

Baseball
 New York Yankees win the World Series, beating Brooklyn Dodgers by 4 games to 1
 Ted Williams records a season batting average of .406; it is the last time a major leaguer hit over .400
 Joe DiMaggio's 56-game hitting streak (May 15 – July 16)

Basketball
NBL Championship

Oshkosh All-Stars win three games to none over the Sheboygan Redskins

Events
 Ninth South American Basketball Championship in Mendoza is won by Argentina.

Boxing
Events
 The highlight of the year is the World Heavyweight title fight between two current world champions, Joe Louis and Billy Conn, won by Louis with a 13th-round knockout.
Lineal world champions
 World Heavyweight Championship – Joe Louis
 World Light Heavyweight Championship – Billy Conn
 World Middleweight Championship – vacant → Tony Zale
 World Welterweight Championship – Fritzie Zivic → Freddie "Red" Cochrane
 World Lightweight Championship – Lew Jenkins → Sammy Angott
 World Featherweight Championship – Harry Jeffra → Joey Archibald → Albert "Chalky" Wright 
 World Bantamweight Championship – Lou Salica
 World Flyweight Championship – vacant

Cricket
England and South Africa
 There is no first-class cricket in England or South Africa due to World War II.
India
 Ranji Trophy – Maharashtra defeats Madras by six wickets.
 Bombay Pentangular – Hindus
Australia
 During the 1940–41 season, although the Sheffield Shield is not contested, a number of interstate cricket matches are played for patriotic funding. For the 1941–42 season, seven three-day interstate matches are scheduled but only one is played before the urgency of the Pacific War puts an end to Australian first-class cricket until November 1945.
New Zealand and West Indies
 New Zealand abandons the Plunket Shield for 1940–41 but here, and in the West Indies, a small number of first-class matches are arranged and played each season until after the war without being part of an official competition.

Cycling
Tour de France
 not contested due to World War II
Giro d'Italia
 not contested due to World War II

Figure skating
World Figure Skating Championships
 not contested due to World War II

Golf
Men's professional
 Masters Tournament – Craig Wood
 1941 U.S. Open – Craig Wood
 British Open – not played due to World War II
 PGA Championship – Vic Ghezzi
Men's amateur
 British Amateur – not played due to World War II
 U.S. Amateur – Bud Ward
Women's professional
 Women's Western Open – Patty Berg
 Titleholders Championship – Dorothy Kirby

Horse racing
Steeplechases
 Cheltenham Gold Cup – Poet Prince
 Grand National – not held due to World War II
Hurdle races
 Champion Hurdle – Seneca
Flat races
 Australia – Melbourne Cup won by Skipton
 Canada – King's Plate won by Budpath
 France – Prix de l'Arc de Triomphe won by Le Pacha
 Ireland – Irish Derby Stakes won by Sol Oriens
 English Triple Crown Races:
 2,000 Guineas Stakes – Lambert Simnel
 The Derby – Owen Tudor
 St. Leger Stakes – Sun Castle
 United States Triple Crown Races:
 Kentucky Derby – Whirlaway
 Preakness Stakes – Whirlaway
 Belmont Stakes – Whirlaway

Ice hockey
 Stanley Cup – Boston Bruins defeat the Detroit Red Wings 4 games to 0.

Motorsport

Rowing
The Boat Race
 Oxford and Cambridge Boat Race is not contested due to World War II

Rugby league
1941 New Zealand rugby league season
1941 NSWRFL season
1940–41 Northern Rugby Football League Wartime Emergency League season / 1941–42 Northern Rugby Football League Wartime Emergency League season

Rugby union
 Five Nations Championship series is not contested due to World War II

Speed skating
Speed Skating World Championships
 not contested due to World War II

Tennis
Australia
 Australian Men's Singles Championship – not contested
 Australian Women's Singles Championship – not contested
England
 Wimbledon Men's Singles Championship – not contested
 Wimbledon Women's Singles Championship – not contested
France
 French Men's Singles Championship – Bernard Destremau (France) defeats Henri Cochet (France) 8–6, 6–2
 French Women's Singles Championship – Alice Weiwers (Luxembourg) † details to be ascertained
USA
 American Men's Singles Championship – Bobby Riggs (USA) defeats Frank Kovacs (USA) 5–7, 6–1, 6–3, 6–3
 American Women's Singles Championship – Sarah Palfrey Cooke (USA) defeats Pauline Betz Addie (USA) 7–5, 6–2
Davis Cup
 1941 International Lawn Tennis Challenge – not contested

Awards
 Associated Press Male Athlete of the Year – Joe DiMaggio, Major League Baseball
 Associated Press Female Athlete of the Year – Betty Hicks Newell, golf

References

 
Sports by year